San Pedro station is a railway station located on the South Main Line in Laguna, Philippines.

Currently, there are 2 stations. The old one, now used as a PNR quarters, used to be the station where passengers can ride trains going to the Bicol region, to the former terminus of the Metro Manila Commuter in Biñan and Calamba stations, and to the former branch line towards Carmona station. It has 3 tracks. One track is the Main Line South, one is the spur line to Carmona, and the other is a loop siding.

In 2010, the tracks of the now abandoned Carmona Branch Line have been dismantled all the way to Carmona station, which was also the terminal of the line.

A new station was constructed in a nearby location near San Vicente road and was opened in December 2013. As of Fall 2013, there were 6 trips in San Pedro station, 2 northbound trips to Tutuban station and 1 trip southbound going to Sta. Rosa station, 1 trip southbound going to Sta. Rosa in the afternoon, and 1 trip northbound going to Tutuban station and 1 last trip for the day going to Sta. Rosa in early evening.

As of October 2018, there were four trips in San Pedro station, two northbound trips to Tutuban, which is in the morning. Those train trips are known as Metro South Commuter Train #456 & #546. 456, which would originate from Mamatid, would arrive at SPL on 5:36 AM. And 546, from Calamba railway station, would arrive exactly one hour later (6:36 AM). And two southbound trips from Tutuban station, which is the evening, known as Metro South Commuter Train #1837 and #1907. 1837, terminating at Calamba railway station, would arrive at SPL on 8:11 PM, and 1907, terminating at Mamatid railway station, would arrive 30 minutes later (8:41 PM).

The branch line leading to Carmona is now a target for reconstruction in anticipation for revival of a shuttle service from Dela Rosa in Makati.

History
San Pedro, formerly known as San Pedro Tunasan, was opened on August 1, 1908 as part of the extension of the Main Line South from Muntinlupa to Calamba, Laguna. It became the first railway station serving the then-town of San Pedro. 

The 1908 station was located at the place where the current San Pedro station stands today. But the station platform and building was located opposite of the platform and present station building and had three tracks. One was a refuge siding, one was a siding loop, and the last one was the Main Line. The old station was last renovated in 1972 for the launching of the Metro Manila Commuter Services led by President Ferdinand Marcos. It became the eastern terminus of the San Pedro–Carmona line from its opening in 1973 to its discontinuation in 2000s.

A new station with raised platforms, located west of the MRR counterpart of the station, was opened on December 23, 2013. For the reopening of commuter services to Santa Rosa, the station reopened on October 5, 2016.

References

Philippine National Railways stations
Railway stations in Laguna (province)
Buildings and structures in San Pedro, Laguna
Railway stations opened in 2013